41 Asian and Oceanian nations including 2 non IOC members (Macau and the Northern Mariana Islands) registered to take part in the 2010–12 Continental Beach Volleyball Cup. The top two from each subzone group qualify for the Zonal tournaments, with the top three from each zonal tournament advancing to the continental championship.

Men

Preliminary round

Central Asia

Pool A
Host: Chennai, India

25–26 September 2010

  and  advanced to the zonal round.

Pool B
Host: Kish Island, Iran

3–4 March 2011

  and  advanced to the zonal round.

Zonal
Host: Negombo, Sri Lanka

 ,  and  advanced to the final round.

East Asia

Pool A
Host: Haikou, China
19–20 October 2010

  and  advanced to the zonal round.

Pool B
Host: Kaohsiung, Taiwan
24–26 December 2010

  and  advanced to the zonal round.

Zonal
Host: Nanning, China

  (as the hosts),  and  advanced to the final round.

Oceania

Pool A
Host: Saipan, Northern Mariana Islands
5–7 March 2011

  and  advanced to the zonal round.

Pool B
Host: Mele, Vanuatu
20–21 May 2011

  and  advanced to the zonal round.

Pool C
Host: Apia, Samoa
26–27 May 2011

  and  advanced to the zonal round.

Zonal
Host: Mount Maunganui, New Zealand

 ,  and  advanced to the final round.

Southeast Asia

Pool A
Host: Batam, Indonesia
24–26 April 2011

  and  advanced to the zonal round.

Pool B
Host: Cha-am, Thailand
1–3 December 2010

  and  advanced to the zonal round.

Zonal
Host: Cha-am, Thailand

 ,  and  advanced to the final round.

West Asia
Host: Ajman, United Arab Emirates
19–22 November 2011

 ,  and  advanced to the final round.

Final round
Host: Fuzhou, China

Women

Preliminary round

Central Asia

Pool A
Host: Chennai, India

25–26 September 2010

 With only  registering for Pool B, all three teams advanced to the zonal round.

Zonal
Host: Negombo, Sri Lanka

 ,  and  advanced to the final round.

East Asia

Pool A
Host: Haikou, China
19–20 October 2010

  and  advanced to the zonal round.

Pool B
Host: Kaohsiung, Taiwan
24–26 December 2010

  and  advanced to the zonal round.

Zonal
Host: Nanning, China

  (as the hosts),  and  advanced to the final round.

Oceania

Pool A
Host: Saipan, Northern Mariana Islands
5–7 March 2011

  and  advanced to the zonal round.

Pool B
Host: Mele, Vanuatu
20–21 May 2011

  and  advanced to the zonal round.

Pool C
Host: Apia, Samoa
26–27 May 2011

  and  advanced to the zonal round.

Zonal
Host: Mount Maunganui, New Zealand

 ,  and  advanced to the final round.

Southeast Asia

Pool A
Host: Batam, Indonesia
24–26 April 2011

  and  advanced to the zonal round.

Pool B
Host: Cha-am, Thailand
1–3 December 2010

  and  advanced to the zonal round.

Zonal
Host: Cha-am, Thailand

 ,  and  advanced to the final round.

Final round
Host: Fuzhou, China

References

O
O
O
Continental Beach Volleyball Cup